The Mount Guanyin also known as the National Forest Park of Mount Guanyin, is a  mountain on the border of Dongguan and Shenzhen in Zhangmutou Town of Dongguan, south China's Guangdong province. On December 28, 2009, it has been categorized as a 4A level tourist site by the National Tourism Administration. It was added to the International Eco-Safety Cooperative Organization of the United Nations's list of the model foundation of international ecological traveling in China in October 2006. Established in 2000, Mount Guanyin National Forest Park is a multifunctional park integrating ecological sightseeing, entertainment, bodybuilding and religious and cultural tourism.

History

In June 2001, a statue of Saint Guanyin was completed. Statue of Saint Guanyin sits in the lotus posture with a vase of clean water in hand, wearing Keyuru, necklaces and decoration and a precious crown on the head. There is a sitting statue of Amitābha on the crown, which is the main symbol of Saint Guanyin.

In 2002, the Museum of Ancient Trees was founded by the Guangzhou Institute of Geography, Guangdong Academy of Sciences and the park, which is the first ancient tree museum in China. It was officially opened to the public on January 11, 2013.

In May 2013, the International Convention Centre was completed and officially opened to the public.

On December 28, 2009, the Mount Guanyin National Forest Park has been rated as a national 4A level scenic spot by the National Tourism Administration. It is the first national forest park of Dongguan authorized by the Bureau of Forestry of China.

Geography
Mount Guanyin is protected within Mount Guanyin National Forest Park.

Climate
The mount enjoys a subtropical maritime monsoon climate and has plenty of rainfall and sunshine, the lowest temperature is 5 °C. Summer usually lasts from April 6 to October 10.

Natural history
There are more than 73 families and 199 plant species in the mount, including Ixonanthes chinensis, Artocarpus hypargyreus, Brainea insignis, Camellia nitidissima, Camellia sinensis, and Dimocarpus longan.

Animals that inhabit the mount are Asiatic salamander, Pangolin, and Owls.

Tourist attractions
The Mount Guanyin National Forest Park has more than twenty tourist spots, including: 
 Guanyin Square 
 Statue of Saint Guanyin
 Guanyin Temple 
 Hall of Three Saints
 Xiangong Peak
 Pudu Creek
 Thanksgiving Lake
 Huiyin Wall
 Yixin Pavilion
 Ciyun Pavilion
 Guanpu Pavilion
 Museum of Ancient Trees
 International Convention Centre
 Xianquan Natatorium

Transportation
 Take train from Guangzhou railway station or Guangzhou East railway station to Zhangmutou railway station.
 Take train from Shenzhen railway station to Zhangmutou railway station.
 Take bus No. 6 to Mount Guanyin National Forest Park station.

References

External links

 

Botanical gardens in Guangdong
Parks in Dongguan
Tourist attractions in Dongguan
Guanyin temples
Colossal Guanyin statues